The 2017 Copa Fila was a professional tennis tournament played on clay courts. It was the seventh edition of the tournament which was part of the 2017 ATP Challenger Tour. It took place in Buenos Aires, Argentina between 9 and 15 October 2017.

Singles main-draw entrants

Seeds

 1 Rankings are as of October 2, 2017.

Other entrants
The following players received wildcards into the singles main draw:
  Sebastián Báez
  Hernán Casanova
  Juan Pablo Ficovich
  Nicolás Kicker

The following players received entry into the singles main draw as alternates:
  Christian Lindell
  Facundo Mena

The following players received entry from the qualifying draw:
  Martín Cuevas
  Marc Giner
  Juan Ignacio Londero
  Mario Vilella Martínez

The following player received entry as a lucky loser:
  Juan Pablo Paz

Champions

Singles

  Nicolás Kicker def.  Horacio Zeballos 6–7(5–7), 6–0, 7–5.

Doubles

  Ariel Behar /  Fabiano de Paula def.  Máximo González /  Fabrício Neis 7–6(7–3), 5–7, [10–8].

References

2017 ATP Challenger Tour
2017
October 2017 sports events in South America